Hula was an open source mail and calendar project based on open standards announced on February 15, 2005 by Novell.

History 

Hula was an open-source effort sponsored by Novell and developed by Dave Camp and Joe Gasiorek, amongst others.

Hula was derived from an existing product by the same software house, called NetMail, and retained many of the architectural features of that software. However, important components such as the mail store were intended to be re-developed to integrate new functionality (such as search) and new features (such as calendaring, using the calendar server protocol CalDAV).

Hula aimed to expand in three main directions:

 A calendaring tool
 A web-based rich mail client
 A search facility for all mail and calendar information within the server

It came with a web-based client to access information, but desktop applications were intended to be readily supported. Novell Evolution released with Hula support in version 2.6, and other clients were expected to support Hula closer to Hula's release.

On November 28, 2006, Novell announced that it would no longer have anyone work on it full-time.

On January 30, 2007, The Messaging Architects announced an agreement to acquire NetMail and take over leadership of the open source Hula Project from Novell.

Since late 2007, the Hula project website has been down. Before it disappeared, it announced the transfer, due to the move of Hula from Novell to The Messaging Architects.

With the future of Hula unclear to many, a software fork of the source code was used to create the independent Bongo Project. Activity on this fork also seems to have been abandoned. Hula/Bongo should not be confused with proprietary mobile phone games Bongo Thinks, Bongo Knows, and Ask Bongo, all of which rely on in-app payments and SMS text messaging.

See also 

 Collaborative software
 List of personal information managers
 Ximian

References

External links 

 Bongo Project

Free groupware
Free email software
Free personal information managers
Message transfer agents